Paddy Ladd (born February 11, 1952) is an English deaf scholar, author, activist and researcher of deaf culture. Ladd was a lecturer and MSc Coordinator (MSc in Deaf Studies to approx 2007, then after a brief pause, MSc in Deafhood Studies 2009) at the Centre for Deaf Studies at the University of Bristol. Despite considerable international pressure, the centre was wound down as the MSc was closed in 2009, the undergrad programme taught out from 2010 to 2013, and the centre finally closed in the July of that year.

Ladd was one of the first presenters of BBC's See Hear and presented the earliest programmes from 1984 in both sign and speech. He has been a core campaigner for Deaf rights since the 80s, and was involved in the National Union of the Deaf, one of the earliest British Deaf activist organisations. He held the Powrie V. Doctor Chair in Deaf Studies at Gallaudet University, Washington DC. He completed his Ph.D. in Deaf Culture at Bristol University in 1998 and has written, edited and contributed to numerous publications in the field. His works have received international recognition. 

Ladd's contribution to the Deaf world has not only been academic. For a period, he toured with the Grateful Dead as their on stage interpreter. He was also the founder of the Glastonbury Festival Sign Zone.

Ladd authored the book, Understanding Deaf Culture: In Search of Deafhood. He was added to the Roll of Honour of the British Deaf Association for “Outstanding Contributions to the Deaf Community in Deaf Education” (2007).

References

External links
Interview on BSL Zone, Close Up - Part 1
Interview on BSL Zone, Close Up - Part 2

Gallaudet University people
Living people
Educators of the deaf
Deaf activists
1952 births
English deaf people
BSL users
Television presenters with disabilities